Colman Robert Hardy Andrews (born February 18, 1945) is an American writer and editor and authority on food and wine. In culinary circles, he is best known for his association with Saveur magazine, which he founded with Dorothy Kalins, Michael Grossman, and Christopher Hirsheimer in 1994 and where he served as editor-in-chief from 2001 until 2006. After resigning from the magazine in 2006, he became the restaurant columnist for Gourmet. In 2010, he helped launch a food and drink website, The Daily Meal, and served as its editorial director until mid-2018. He is now a senior editor specializing in food and travel for 24/7 Wall St. He is considered one of the world's foremost experts on Spanish cuisine, particularly that of the Catalonia region.

Early life
Born in Santa Monica, California. His father, Charles Robert Hardy Douglas Andrews, born in Effingham, Kansas, was a newspaperman, pioneering radio soap opera writer, novelist, and screenwriter. Andrews' mother was Irene Colman (née Bressette), an actress of French-Canadian descent born in Nashua, New Hampshire. She played a chorus girl in several Gold Diggers movies and had ingenue roles in a number of other movies. Andrews and his sister, Ann Merry Victoria Andrews (two years his junior) and his older half-sister Joy grew up in the West Los Angeles neighborhood of Holmby Hills. The family moved to Ojai, north of Los Angeles, in 1959, and Andrews attended Villanova Preparatory School in the same town.

Early career
After high school, Andrews went on to Loyola University – now Loyola Marymount University – in Los Angeles as an English major. Kicked out of Loyola after one year for ignoring his studies in favor of the campus radio station, Andrews spent the next year-and-a-half working and traveling, living for brief periods in Atlanta and Cambridge, Massachusetts. Returning to Los Angeles, he enrolled at Los Angeles City College in 1965. He took a job in the bookshop at the Los Angeles County Museum of Art the same year. In 1968, after a year-and-a-half at Los Angeles City College and a year at California State University at Los Angeles, Andrews was accepted at the University of California at Los Angeles. He graduated in 1969 with degrees in history and philosophy.

Andrews' first restaurant reviewing job was for The Staff, an offshoot of the Los Angeles Free Press.  In early 1972, Andrews, a music lover and amateur singer and songwriter, was hired by the publicity department of Atlantic Records and penned press releases for such albums as Bette Midler's and Jackson Browne's debuts. Still writing restaurant reviews on the side, he began to seriously study wine and was a fan in particular of the wine writer Roy Brady, who espoused the notion that a wine should be judged not by its reputation or price but instead by what it smells and tastes like. Brady became his mentor in wine matters.

Magazine life
Andrews left Atlantic to become the editor of Coast, a Los Angeles-based lifestyle magazine; he held the position until 1975. Meanwhile, Andrews continued reviewing records for Creem, where Lester Bangs was his editor, and covering live music in the LA area for The Hollywood Reporter . He also wrote liner notes for numerous albums, receiving a Grammy nomination in 1972 for notes on a special edition of Miles Davis reissues. In 1975, Lois Dwan, restaurant reviewer for Los Angeles Times, asked Andrews to substitute for her while she went on vacation. This began his long association with the newspaper; though not officially on staff, he was alternately a restaurant reviewer and columnist, book reviewer and travel writer, and the editor of the paper's travel magazine, Traveling in Style. He contributed pieces to Ampersand's Entertainment Guide from 1977 to the mid-1980s. In 1978, Andrews, was hired as an associate editor at New West magazine, a bi-weekly California publication started by Clay Felker as a parallel to his seminal New York magazine. He was promoted a year later to senior editor. During this time he met Ruth Reichl, then the restaurant columnist for the Northern California edition of New West, who would go on to become the restaurant critic of The New York Times from 1993 to 1999, and, later, the editor-in-chief of Gourmet magazine. For a period the two were lovers, their relationship chronicled in Reichl's memoir Comfort Me with Apples (Random House, 2002).

Andrews left New West in 1980 and began writing for Apartment Life, an urbane lifestyle magazine helmed by Dorothy Kalins. A year later that magazine was transformed into Metropolitan Home. Over the course of that magazine's first decade . Andrews wrote about restaurants all over the world; he was the first American reporter to introduce readers to the great French chef Guy Savoy. Perhaps most significantly, Andrews got a contract to write a book on Catalan cuisine based on an article he'd written for Met Home. Throughout the eighties he spent a great deal of time traveling to Barcelona and vicinity. The resulting book, Catalan Cuisine, published in 1988 and still in print, has become the standard reference book for restaurant kitchens in that region, and is revered by the top local chefs, including the world-renowned Ferran Adria.

Saveur and Later 
After finishing his Catalan book, Andrews worked as a freelancer, writing articles for the Los Angeles Times and for Bon Appetit, Food & Wine, Travel & Leisure, and many other publications. In 1992, Andrews published his second book, Everything on the Table: Plain Talk About Food and Wine, a collection of new and revised short pieces, and shortly thereafter he began work on a book about the cuisines of Genoa and Nice, Flavors of the Riviera: Discovering Real Mediterranean Cuisine, published in 1996. Meanwhile, in 1994, Andrews had become a co-founder of Saveur magazine, and in late 1995, he moved from Los Angeles to New York City. The magazine was the first of its kind to delve beyond recipes and formulas and tell the stories of the people and cultures behind the food. During his tenure, Andrews won six James Beard Journalism Awards, and in 2000, Saveur became the first food magazine to win the American Society of Magazine Editors' award for General Excellence. The following year, after the magazine changed ownership, Kalins left to work for Newsweek and Andrews took over as editor-in-chief. He left Saveur in 2006, becoming the restaurant columnist for Gourmet and undertaking new book projects—the first of which, The Country Cooking of Ireland, was published in 2009 by Chronicle Books. This was followed by Ferran Adrià: The Man Who Reinvented Food (2010), The Country Cooking of Italy (2011), The Taste of America (2013), My Usual Table: A Life in Restaurants (2014), and The British Table: A New Look at the Traditional Cooking of England, Scotland, and Wales.

References

External links
 Oxford Symposium on Food, 2005
 Colman Andrews speech at Good Food Ireland showcase event
 Colman Andrews on Gourmet.com
 http://www.thefoodsection.com/appetizers/2006/08/colman_andrews_.html
 https://web.archive.org/web/20080907045555/http://gawker.com/news/gourmet/andrews-exits-saveur-for-the-comfort-of-reichls-apples-191555.php
 https://www.amazon.com/Catalan-Cuisine-Europes-Culinary-Secret/dp/1558321543
 http://articles.latimes.com/writers/colman-andrews
 https://web.archive.org/web/20110927104844/http://www.wunc.org/tsot/archive/sot0605b.mp3/view
 http://www.restaurantguysradio.com/sle/rg/content/shows/index.asp?show_id=180
 http://www.jamesbeard.org/index.php?q=search/node/colman+andrews
 https://web.archive.org/web/20080622235833/http://www.tienda.com/table/products/bk-08.html
 https://www.nytimes.com/1990/07/08/travel/fare-of-the-country-with-satay-and-tiger-prawns-fiery-thai-food-is-a-hit-in-la.html
 http://chowhound.chow.com/topics/440333

Wine critics
American food writers
Los Angeles City College alumni
1945 births
Living people
American restaurant critics
American male non-fiction writers
James Beard Foundation Award winners
People from Holmby Hills, Los Angeles